In mathematics, the Melnikov method is a tool to identify the existence of chaos in a class of dynamical systems under periodic perturbation.

Introduction 

The Melnikov method is used in many cases to predict the occurrence of chaotic orbits in non-autonomous smooth nonlinear systems under periodic perturbation. According to the method is possible to construct a function called "Melnikov function", and hence to predict either regular or chaotic behavior of a studied dynamical system. Thus, the Melnikov function will be used to determine a measure of distance between stable and unstable manifolds in the Poincaré map. Moreover, when this measure is equal to zero, by the method, those manifolds crossed each other transversally and from that crossing the system will become chaotic.

This method appeared in 1890 by H. Poincaré  and by V. Melnikov in 1963  and could be called the "Poincaré-Melnikov Method". Moreover, it was described by several textbooks as Guckenheimer & Holmes, Kuznetsov, S. Wiggins, Awrejcewicz & Holicke and others. There are many applications for Melnikov distance as it can be used to predict chaotic vibrations. In this method, critical amplitude is found by setting the distance between homoclinic orbits and stable manifolds equal to zero. Just like in Guckenheimer & Holmes where they were the first who based on the KAM theorem, determined a set of parameters of relatively weak perturbed Hamiltonian systems of two-degrees-of-freedom, at which homoclinic bifurcation occurred.

The Melnikov distance 
Consider the following class of systems given by

or in vector form

If , then there is an unperturbed system

From this system (3), looking at the phase space in Figure 1, consider the following assumptions

 A1 - The system has a hyperbolic fixed point , connected to itself by a homoclinic orbit  
 A2 - The system is filled inside by a continuous family  of periodic orbits  of period with  where 

To obtain the Melnikov function, some tricks have to be used, for example, to get rid of the time dependence and to gain geometrical advantages new coordinate has to be used  that is cyclic type given by Then, the system (1) could be rewritten in vector form as follows

By the assumption   and coincide along a two-dimensional homoclinic manifold. This is denoted by where  is the time of flight from a point to the point on the homoclinic connection.

In the Figure 3, for any point  a vector is constructed , normal to the as follows Thus varying and serve to move to every point on

Splitting of stable and unstable manifolds 
If  is sufficiently small, which is the system (2), then  becomes   becomes  and the stable and unstable manifolds become different from each other.

unperturbed and perturbed vector fields, respectively.

The manifolds  and  may intersect  in more than one point as shown in Figure 5. For it to be possible, after every intersection, for  sufficiently small, the trajectory must pass through  again.

Deduction of the Melnikov function 
Expanding in Taylor series the eq. (5) about  gives us  where  and 

When  then the Melnikov function is defined to be

Using eq. (6) it will require knowing the solution to the perturbed problem. To avoid this, Melnikov defined a time dependent Melnikov function 

 

Taking the time-derivative of this function allows for some simplifications. The time-derivative of one of the terms in eq. (7) is
From the equation of motion, 
then
Plugging equations (2) and (9) back into (8) gives

Integrating the remaining term, the expression for the original terms does not depend on the solution of the perturbed problem.

The lower integration bound has been chosen to be the time where , so that  and therefore the boundary terms are zero. 

Combining these terms and setting  the final form for the Melnikov distance is obtained by

Then, using this equation, the following theorem

Theorem 1: Suppose there is a point such that

 i)  and
 ii) .

Then, for  sufficiently small,  and  intersect transversely at  Moreover, if  for all , then

Simple zeros of the Melnikov function imply chaos 
From theorem 1 when there is a simple zero of the Melnikov function implies in transversal intersections of the stable and manifolds that results in a homoclinic tangle. Such tangle is a very complicated structure with the stable and unstable manifolds intersecting an infinite number of times.

Consider a small element of phase volume, departing from the neighborhood of a point near the transversal intersection, along the unstable manifold of a fixed point. Clearly, when this volume element approaches the hyperbolic fixed point it will be distorted considerably, due to the repetitive infinite intersections and stretching (and folding) associated with the relevant invariant sets. Therefore, it is reasonably expect that the volume element will undergo an infinite sequence of stretch and fold transformations as the horseshoe map. Then, this intuitive expectation is rigorously confirmed by a theorem stated as follows

Theorem 2: Suppose that a diffeomorphism where is an n-dimensional manifold, has a hyperbolic fixed point with a stable and unstable manifold that intersect transversely at some point , where  Then, contains a hyperbolic set  invariant under on which is topologically conjugate to a shift on finitely many symbols.

Thus, according to the theorem 2, it implies that the dynamics with a transverse homoclinic point is topologically similar to the horseshoe map and it has the property of sensitivity to initial conditions and hence when the Melnikov distance (10) has a simple zero, it implies that the system is chaotic.

References 

Dynamical systems